This is a list of the 16 trolleybus routes running in Bucharest, Romania, operated by the city's public transport company, STB as of July 2015. For more information about Bucharest's trolleybus network, see Trolleybuses in Bucharest. Routes marked with  use wheelchair-accessible low-floor vehicles (Irisbus Citelis) on some services, however the Ikarus 415T trolleys are more common.

There are also other routes not running due to ongoing works on the M4 and M5 metro lines.

Routes

Temporary Suspended lines :

71 : Valea Argesului - Gara de Nord. Its place is taken by 93 (previously Gara de Nord - Valea Ialomitei) Suspended due to underground works. 90 and 91 were rerouted from Valea Ialomitei to Valea Argesului respectively to Depoul Alexandria. 

92 : Vasile Parvan - Universitate - Barajul Dunarii. Suspended due to tram line works in Titan and road rehabilitation . Probably its Barajul Dunarii end of line will be changed.

See also
Transport in Bucharest

References

 
Bucharest
Trolleybus routes
Trolleybus routes